Dennis "Delta" Garcia Pineda (born May 6, 1974) is a Filipino politician from the province of Pampanga in the Philippines. He currently serves as the Governor of Pampanga. He was a former Vice Governor of the province in the past years, and he was elected in 2019 as the 14th Governor of the province. Previously, he served as the mayor of Lubao from 2001 until 2010.

Pineda is the son of former governor and now-vice governor Lilia Pineda and businessman Rodolfo "Bong" Pineda.

References

External links
Province of Pampanga

|-

|-

Living people
Governors of Pampanga
Nationalist People's Coalition politicians
1974 births
People from Pampanga